Procyonidae is a family of mammals in the order Carnivora, which includes raccoons, coatis, olingos, kinkajous, ring-tailed cats, and cacomistles, and many other extant and extinct mammals. A member of this family is called a procyonid. They are native to North and South America, though the common raccoon has been introduced to Europe, western Asia, and Japan. Procyonid habitats are generally forests, though some are found in shrublands and grasslands as well. The ring-tailed cat has a varied range including rocky areas and deserts as well as forests, and the common raccoon is widespread in urban environments. Population sizes are largely unknown, though the Cozumel raccoon is critically endangered, with around 200 individuals left, and the Eastern mountain coati is endangered. No procyonid species have been domesticated, although raccoons are sometimes kept as pets.

The fourteen species of Procyonidae are split into six genera, which are not currently grouped into named clades. Procyonidae is believed to have diverged as a separate family within Carnivora around 22.6 million years ago. In addition to the extant species,  Procyonidae includes forty extinct species placed in the six extant and nineteen extinct genera, though due to ongoing research and discoveries the exact number and categorization is not fixed.

Conventions

Conservation status codes listed follow the International Union for Conservation of Nature (IUCN) Red List of Threatened Species. Range maps are provided wherever possible; if a range map is not available, a description of the procyonid's range is provided. Ranges are based on the IUCN Red List for that species unless otherwise noted. All extinct species or subspecies listed alongside extant species went extinct after 1500 CE, and are indicated by a dagger symbol. Population figures are rounded to the nearest hundred.

Classification
The family Procyonidae consists of fourteen extant species belonging to six genera and divided into dozens of extant subspecies. This does not include hybrid species or extinct prehistoric species. Some prior classification schemes included the red panda or divided the family into named subfamilies and tribes based on similarities in morphology, though modern molecular studies indicate instead that the kinkajou is basal to the family, while raccoons, cacomistles, and ring-tailed cats form one clade and coatis and olingos another, despite morphology suggesting otherwise.

 Genus Bassaricyon (olingos): four species
 Genus Bassariscus (ring-tailed cats and cacomistles): two species
 Genus Nasua (coatis): two species
 Genus Nasuella (mountain coatis): two species
 Genus Potos (kinkajous): one species
 Genus Procyon (raccoons): three species

Procyonids
The following classification is based on the taxonomy described by Mammal Species of the World (2005), with augmentation by generally accepted proposals made since using molecular phylogenetic analysis; this includes rearranging Bassaricyon from five species to a mostly different four, and promoting the eastern mountain coati from a subspecies of the mountain coati. There are additional proposals which are disputed, such as promoting the Guadeloupe raccoon population of the Bahamian raccoon subspecies of raccoon to a separate subspecies, which are not included here.

Prehistoric procyonids
In addition to extant procyonids, some prehistoric species have been discovered and classified as a part of Procyonidae. There is no generally accepted classification of extinct procyonid species. The species listed here are based on data from the Paleobiology Database, unless otherwise cited. Where available, the approximate time period the species was extant is given in millions of years before the present (Mya), also based on data from the Paleobiology Database. All listed species are extinct; where a genus or subfamily within Procyonidae comprises only extinct species, it is indicated with a dagger symbol .

 Genus Angustictis (23–20 Mya)
 A. mayri (23–20 Mya)
 Genus Amphinasua
 Genus Arctonasua (16–4.9 Mya)
 A. eurybates (11–4.9 Mya)
 A. floridana (14–10 Mya)
 A. fricki (11–4.9 Mya)
 A. gracilis (16–13 Mya)
 A. minima (16–13 Mya)
 Genus Bassaricynoides (21–15 Mya)
 B. phyllismillerae (21–15 Mya)
 B. stewartae (21–15 Mya)
 Genus Brachynasua
 B. merani
 Genus Broiliana
 B. dehmi
 B. nobilis (16–13 Mya)
 Genus Chapalmalania
 C. altaefrontis
 C. ortognatha
 Genus Cyonasua
 C. argentina (9.0–6.8 Mya)
 C. brevirrostris
 C. clausa (6.8–4.0 Mya)
 C. groeberi (9.0–4.0 Mya)
 C. longirostris
 C. lutaria
 C. meranii
 C. pascuali (9.0–6.8 Mya)
 C. robusta

 Genus Edaphocyon (21–13 Mya)
 E. lautus (21–15 Mya)
 E. palmeri (21–15 Mya)
 E. pointblankensis (16–13 Mya)
 Genus Myxophagus
 M. spelaeus
 Genus Nasua (10 Mya–present)
 N. nicaeensis
 N. pronarica (4.9–1.8 Mya)
 Genus Pachynasua
 P. clausa
 Genus Parahyaenodon (6.8–4.0 Mya)
 P. argentinus (6.8–4.0 Mya)
 Genus Paranasua (14–10 Mya)
 P. biradica (14–10 Mya)
 Genus Parapotos (16–13 Mya)
 P. tedfordi (16–13 Mya)
 Genus Probassariscus (16–13 Mya)
 P. matthewi (16–13 Mya)
 Genus Procyon (10 Mya–present)
 P. rexroadensis (4.9–1.8 Mya)
 Genus Protoprocyon (14–10 Mya)
 P. savagei (14–10 Mya)
 Genus Sivanasua
 S. viverroides
 Genus Stromeriella (23–13 Mya)
 S. depressa (23–20 Mya)
 S. franconica (16–13 Mya)
 Genus Tetraprothomo (6.8–4.0 Mya)
 T. argentinus (6.8–4.0 Mya)

References

 
Procyonidae
Procyonidae